Treta Yuga, in Hinduism, is the second and second best of the four yugas (world ages) in a Yuga Cycle, preceded by Krita (Satya) Yuga and followed by Dvapara Yuga. Treta Yuga lasts for 1,296,000 years (3,600 divine years).

Treta means 'a collection of three things' in Sanskrit, and is so called because during the Treta Yuga, there were three Avatars of Vishnu that were seen, the fifth, sixth and seventh incarnations as Vamana, Parashurama and Rama, respectively. The bull of Dharma symbolizes that morality stood on three legs during this period. It had all four legs in the Satya Yuga and two in the succeeding Dvapara Yuga. Currently, in the immoral age of Kali, it stands on one leg.

Etymology

Treta Yuga means "the age of three or triads", where its length is three times that of Kali Yuga, and the Dharma bull, which symbolizes morality, stands on three legs during this period.

Treta Yuga is described in the Mahabharata, Manusmriti, Surya Siddhanta, Vishnu Smriti, and various Puranas.

Duration and structure

Hindu texts describe four yugas (world ages)⁠ in a Yuga Cycle, where, starting in order from the first age of Krita (Satya) Yuga, each yuga's length decreases by one-fourth (25%), giving proportions of 4:3:2:1. Each yuga is described as having a main period ( yuga proper) preceded by its  (dawn) and followed by its  (dusk)⁠, where each twilight (dawn/dusk) lasts for one-tenth (10%) of its main period. Lengths are given in divine years (years of the gods), each lasting for 360 solar (human) years.

Treta Yuga, the second age in a cycle, lasts for 1,296,000 years (3,600 divine years), where its main period lasts for 1,080,000 years (3,000 divine years) and its two twilights each lasts for 108,000 years (300 divine years). The current cycle's Treta Yuga has the following dates based on Kali Yuga, the fourth and present age, starting in 3102BCE:

Mahabharata, Book 12 (Shanti Parva), Ch. 231:

Manusmriti, Ch. 1:

Surya Siddhanta, Ch. 1:

Characteristics

Vamana, Parashurama, and Rama are believed to have lived during the Treta Yuga.

See also
 Hindu units of time
 Kalpa (day of Brahma)
 Manvantara (age of Manu)
 Pralaya (period of dissolution)
 Yuga Cycle (four yuga ages): Satya (Krita), Treta, Dvapara, and Kali
 Itihasa (Hindu Tradition)
 List of numbers in Hindu scriptures
 Vedic-Puranic chronology

Notes

References

Four Yugas
Shabda